Bassanago is a genus of marine congrid eels.

Species
There are currently four recognized species in this genus:
 Bassanago albescens (Barnard, 1923) (Hairy conger)
 Bassanago bulbiceps Whitley, 1948 (Swollen-headed conger eel)
 Bassanago hirsutus (Castle, 1960) (Deepsea conger)
 Bassanago nielseni (Karmovskaya, 1990)

References

 Tony Ayling & Geoffrey Cox, Collins Guide to the Sea Fishes of New Zealand,  (William Collins Publishers Ltd, Auckland, New Zealand 1982) 

Congridae